King in Prussia is a 1944 historical novel by the Italian-born British writer Rafael Sabatini. It portrays the formative years of Frederick the Great, who ruled Prussia during the eighteenth century. It was released in the United States under the alternative title The Birth of Mischief.

References

Bibliography
 Daniel S. Burt. The Biography Book: A Reader's Guide to Nonfiction, Fictional, and Film Biographies of More Than 500 of the Most Fascinating * Individuals of All Time. Greenwood Publishing Group, 2001

1944 British novels
British historical novels
Novels set in the 18th century
Novels set in Germany
Novels by Rafael Sabatini
Cultural depictions of Frederick the Great
Hutchinson (publisher) books